The Boulevard Périphérique, often called the Périph, is a controlled-access dual-carriageway ring road in Paris, France. With a few exceptions (see Structure and Layout), it is situated along Paris's administrative limit.

The speed limit along the Périphérique is 70 km/h (45 mph). Each ring generally has four traffic lanes, with no hard shoulder. Its major interchanges are called portes. At junctions, vehicles in the rightmost lane (separated from other lanes in these areas by a continuous white line to the left) must yield to entering vehicles.

When travelling at the legal speed limit, it takes approximately 30 minutes to complete a full circuit of the Périphérique.

History

In 1846, the French War Ministry completed the defensive Thiers wall around Paris, including fortifications, a dry moat, a Rue Militaire and a large berm. In 1859, the military engineering department gave conditional control of the perimeter to the precursor of the current Paris city council. The expansion of Paris in 1860, achieved through annexation of bordering communities, created a situation where everything within the Thiers wall was Paris and everything outside was not. The Thiers wall led to a profound disruption of the synergistic relationship between Paris and its suburbs.

In 1861, the Paris city council started converting some sections of the Rue Militaire into boulevards. In the 1920s, the complete dismantling of the Thiers wall allowed further construction of what is today a series of over 20 connected boulevards encircling the city. This inner quasi-ring road came to be known as the Boulevards of the Marshals, as most of the boulevards bear the name of a marshal who served under Napoleon I. The road construction largely helped to reconnect Paris with its burgeoning suburbs. The Boulevards of the Marshals were almost fully completed by 1932, though the final three sections would not be added until 2005, closing the ring over 80 years after construction began. The Boulevards of the Marshals were built just inside the city limits, leaving a ring of vacant land just outside their perimeter.

Construction of the Périphérique began in 1958 on the remaining area once occupied by the Thiers Wall; the space not already taken up by the Boulevards of the Marshals measured anywhere from a few meters to the width of a city block. Unlike the Boulevards of the Marshals, the road bears only a single name, Boulevard Périphérique. In order to alleviate traffic congestion, the Périphérique was built more like a motorway than a wide boulevard, and was completed on 25 April 1973 under the presidency of Georges Pompidou.  Used in a quarter of all Parisian traffic movements, it quickly became the busiest road in France. The Périphérique became a victim of its own success, plagued by widespread congestion and blocked from expansion by dense surrounding urban areas.

Périphérique intérieur vs. extérieur
The Périphérique consists of two concentric carriageways: the intérieur ("inner ring") and the extérieur ("outer ring"). Vehicles travel clockwise on the inner ring and counterclockwise on the outer ring. Stretches of the road are sometimes referred to by cardinal direction. For example, in the southern half of the highway, the "inner ring" is designated as the Périphérique Ouest ("Western Ring"), as traffic there flows westbound, whereas the "outer ring" is designated as the Périphérique Est ("Eastern Ring"), as traffic flows eastbound. In the northern half, these designations are reversed.

Structure and layout

The structure of the Boulevard Périphérique is similar to most French autoroutes, UK and Commonwealth nation motorways, and American freeways in the following ways:
 It is a two-ring, multiple-lane controlled access road with no at-grade crossings or traffic lights. Maximum longitudinal slope is 4%.
 Traffic in opposite directions is separated by a median strip.

But the Périphérique is also different from some of its domestic and foreign counterparts:
 Motorists entering the right-hand lane have the right-of-way, i.e. priority over vehicles already on the ring road. This stems from the traditional rules governing Parisian boulevards.
 The right-hand lane is reserved for vehicles entering or preparing to leave the "normal" movement of vehicles in the other lanes, or the Boulevard itself. A solid white line separates recently entered traffic and circulating traffic. This is to prevent entering traffic from disrupting the flow of circulating traffic in the inner lanes, since all traffic would otherwise have to yield to any entering traffic, across all lanes.
 There is no hard shoulder (emergency lane), except around the Porte de Gentilly. This means that crashes can cause considerable disruption to traffic, making it difficult for emergency services to reach the scene of a crash.

There are generally four lanes in each of the two rings of the Boulevard. Variations exist:
 A two-lane section between the Porte d'Italie and the Porte d'Orléans
 A five-lane section between the Porte de Montreuil and Porte de Bagnolet
 A three-lane section between the Porte d'Orléans and the Porte de Sèvres.

The entire Boulevard Périphérique is 35.04 kilometres long, as measured along the central median strip. The route closely follows the municipal boundaries of Paris, but diverges in the Bois de Boulogne and Bois de Vincennes (where the roadway is cut and covered), and the Paris Heliport. Because the Boulevard was built over the old Thiers Wall, its entrance/exit ramps and interchanges coincide with locations of the wall's former city gates, or portes. The road crosses the River Seine via bridges upstream at Charenton/Bercy and downstream at Saint-Cloud/Issy.

Small distance markers are distributed evenly alongside the roadway:
 The 00.0 kilometre point is over the River Seine, upstream of the Porte de Bercy, at the bridge's expansion joints.
 Distances from this point increase in the clockwise direction.
 The distance markers on the sign are underlined in red on the inner ring road, and in blue on the outer ring.

The roadway varies in elevation:
 50% is elevated above its surroundings, i.e. above grade.
 40% is constructed in trench sections, i.e. below grade.
 10% is at ground level, i.e. at grade.

The Boulevard Périphérique can carry the heaviest vehicles allowed by French regulations. There is a height restriction of 4.75 metres (15 feet, 8 inches).

Speed control
The Boulevard Périphérique is equipped with speed cameras to enforce the 70 km/h (43 mph) speed limit. The cameras are oriented to photograph vehicle plates from behind, and are reportedly located near the following interchanges:

On the inner ring, at:

 Porte de Sèvres
 Porte de Champerret
 crossing the Quai d'Ivry, at the end of the bridge
 Porte de Bagnolet

On the outer ring, at:

 Porte de Châtillon
 Porte de Clichy
 Porte de Pantin
 Porte d'Auteuil

In addition, the Périphérique's exit ramps are often monitored with hand-held binocular-type radar devices; these are triggered when the 50 km/h (31 mph) exiting limit is exceeded.

Finally, during rush hour, radar-equipped police vehicles are often positioned in hidden areas for further spot checks.

Network monitoring and traffic management
Approximately one hundred traffic cameras are installed along the Périphérique, directly connected to the control room of its traffic management office. There are 166 emergency telephones, located every 500 metres along the ring road (every 250 metres underground), which handle 7,000 calls per year. The emergency phones are all numbered, with odd-numbered phones on the outer ring and even-numbered ones on the inner ring road.

Eight police vehicles continuously patrol the Périphérique during the day; four do so at night.

750 sensors embedded in the road surface record each passing vehicle, measuring flow rate, occupancy rate and/or traffic velocity on given portions of the Périphérique. Variable-message signs provide information on the estimated journey time to the next major exit, automatically generating updates every minute via a computer system using data from the sensors. The system also displays general information on accidents, road closures and road work.

Other ring roads
The Boulevard Périphérique is not the only means of bypassing the interior of the French capital:

 Within the city boundaries, the Boulevards des Marechaux (Boulevards of the Marshals) encircle Paris, approximately 100 m inside the Périphérique. This is a collection of urban streets with standard crossings with other streets or tunnels under some major routes of entry. The speed limit is 50 km/h.
 Beyond the city boundaries, the A86 (also known as the super-périphérique) encircles Paris at a distance of 2–7 km from the Périphérique.
 Approximately 20 km from the Périphérique, a partially completed ring road called the Francilienne.
 Another project, the Grand contournement de Paris, has also been partially constructed.

Map

List of junctions

Statistics
 Traffic in 2010 consisted of:
 Around 240,000 vehicles per day, i.e. 2% of all trips in Paris, and significantly less than those made by bike[./Boulevard_Périphérique#cite_note-FOOTNOTEDemade201581-4 [4]]
 89% cars and light trucks, 7% trucks, 4% motorcycles
 Total length: 
 Average trip length: 
 Speed limit: 
 Average speed on working days (7:00 am-9:00 pm):

See also

 Boulevards of the Marshals
 Périphérique (Caen)
 A86 autoroute
 Francilienne

References

Works cited
 

Ring roads in France
Transport in Paris